The Climate Data Exchange (CDX) is a JPL software framework, built on the Apache Object Oriented Data Technology (OODT) software, for sharing climate data and models.

References

External links
 https://web.archive.org/web/20090803225237/http://cdx.jpl.nasa.gov/
 http://oodt.apache.org

Object-oriented programming